Donald Neil Hewson (28 October 1919 – 12 July 2017) was an Australian rules footballer who played with Melbourne in the Victorian Football League (VFL).

Notes

External links 

Don Hewson on Demonwiki

1919 births
Australian rules footballers from Victoria (Australia)
Melbourne Football Club players
2017 deaths